The Kamakã languages are a small family of extinct Macro-Jê languages of Bahía, northeastern Brazil. The attested Kamakã languages are:
 (northern) Kamakã (dialects: Mongoyó/Mangaló), Kotoxó, Menién 
 (southern) Masakará

Varieties

Loukotka (1968)
Below is a full list of Kamakã languages and dialects listed by Loukotka (1968), including names of unattested varieties.

Southern
Kamakán / Ezeshio - once spoken on the Ilhéus River, De Contas River and Pardo River, Bahia state.
Mangaló / Mongoyo / Monshoko - extinct language once spoken on the lower Pardo River near the frontier of Bahia and Minas Gerais states.
Kutasho / Cotoxo / Catathoy - once spoken between the Pardo River and De Contas River.
Menien / Manyã - once spoken at the sources of the Jequitinhonha River.
Dendi - once spoken in the Serra Geral de Condeúba, frontier area between the states of Bahia and Minas Gerais. (Unattested)
Catolé - once spoken in the state of Minas Gerais in the valleys of the Pardo River and Verde River. (Unattested)
Imboré / Amboré - once spoken at the sources of the Gongogi River, Bahia state. (Unattested)
Piripiri - once spoken in the state of Minas Gerais in the valleys of the Verde River and Gorutuba River. (Unattested)
Payaya - once spoken on the Camamu River, Bahia state. (Unattested)

Northern
Masacará - extinct language once spoken south of the city of Juazeiro and in the old mission of Saco dos Morcegos, state of Bahia.

Mason (1950)
Camacán (Kamakán) varieties listed by Mason (1950):

Camacán (Kamakán)
Mongoyó
Monshocó (Ezeshio)
Cutashó (Kotoxó)
Catethoy (Katathoy)
Menián (Manyá)
Masacará

Classification

Martins (2007)
Internal classification of the Kamakã languages by Martins (2007):

Kamakã
Masakará
(core branch)
Kamakã
Menien
Kotoxó, Mongoyó

Masakará is the most divergent language.

Ramirez (2015)
Internal classification of the Kamakã languages according to Ramirez, et al. (2015):

Masakará
Kamakã proper
Menien
Kamakã (including Kotoxó, Mongoyó, Monxokó, Katatoi, etc.)

Nikulin (2020)
Internal classification of the Kamakã languages according to Nikulin (2020):

Masakará
Southern Kamakã
Menien
Kamakã; Kotoxó/Mongoyó

Vocabulary
Loukotka (1968) lists the following basic vocabulary items.

{| class="wikitable sortable"
! gloss !! Kamakan !! Mangaló !! Menien !! Kutasho !! Masacará
|-
! head
| heró || hero || inro || heró || axaró
|-
! eye
| an-kedó || kedó || im-gutó || kithó || gätxt
|-
! tooth
| txó || dió || yo || dió || thüó
|-
! foot
| wadé || uadä ||  || hoata || huaxtö
|-
! water
| d san || sa || sa || sin || tsyin
|-
! fire
| yakó || diaxka || yarú || tiakíl || guxá
|-
! star
| pʔiong || péo || pinia || pião || pinatsö
|-
! maize
| hikamhi || kesho || kshó || kethió || käxü
|-
! jaguar
| yakoe-dere || yaké-deré || kukiamú || tiuké-hiá || yakveo
|-
! black
| kohada || koaxéda || kuatá || tá || koeixtá
|}

Proto-language

Proto-Kamakã reconstructions by Martins (2007):

{| class="wikitable sortable"
! Portuguese gloss(original) !! English gloss(translated) !! Proto-Kamakã
|-
| água || water || *tsã
|-
| andar || to walk || *mã
|-
| anta || tapir || *here
|-
| arara || macaw || *tʃoke
|-
| arco || bow || *kwã
|-
| árvore || tree || *hi
|-
| banana || banana || *tako
|-
| beber || to drink || *ka
|-
| beber (água) || to drink (water) || *tsã-ka
|-
| belo || beautiful || *tʃoho
|-
| boca || mouth || *eriko
|-
| branco || white || *kVhVro
|-
| cabeça || head || *hero
|-
| cabelo || hair || *ke
|-
| carne || meat || *kohoaja
|-
| casa || house || *toa
|-
| chuva || rain || *tsã
|-
| comer || to eat || *jukwa
|-
| dente || tooth || *tʃo
|-
| dormir || to sleep || *hondõ
|-
| esp. de banana || banana sp. || *tako
|-
| estrela || star || *pio
|-
| faca || knife || *ketʃa, *ketja
|-
| feijão || bean || *kinja
|-
| filha || daughter || *kiaxrará
|-
| filha, filho || daughter, son || *krani
|-
| filho || son || *ketje
|-
| flecha || arrow || *hwaj, *waj
|-
| fogo || fire || *tʃakɨ, *tjakɨ
|-
| irmã || sister || *tʃakarata, *jak(a)ratã
|-
| lua || moon || *hetʃe, *hedje
|-
| macaco || monkey || *kaũ
|-
| machado || axe || *kedo
|-
| madeira || wood || *hi)-ta
|-
| mandioca || manioc || *kajɨ
|-
| mão || hand || *ker
|-
| menino || boy || *kwanĩ
|-
| milho || maize || *ketʃo
|-
| milho || maize || *ketjo
|-
| muito || very || *hie-hie
|-
| nariz || nose || *niniko
|-
| olho || eye || *keto
|-
| onça (Felis onça) || jaguar (Felis) || *jake
|-
| orelha || ear || *nikoka
|-
| pai || father || *kehentã
|-
| papagaio || parrot || *karaj
|-
| pássaro || bird || *tʃano
|-
| pequeno || small || *(V)ta
|-
| preto, negro || black || *kwahda, *kwaxda
|-
| quati || coati || *pitako
|}

References

Alain Fabre, 2005, Diccionario etnolingüístico y guía bibliográfica de los pueblos indígenas sudamericanos: KAMAKÃ.

 
Language families
Macro-Jê languages
Indigenous languages of Northeastern Brazil